McCarthy is a surname originating from the Irish noble McCarthy Clan of Cork County, Ireland.  The name has spread throughout the world and is most often found in the Americas, where over 57% of individuals with the surname McCarthy are located. The surname, meaning "son of Cárthach" originated in Ireland. Commons variants of the name include McCarty and MacCarthy. Sixty percent of people with the surname in Ireland itself originate from Cork County, where the family was very powerful in the Middle Ages.

Notable people with the surname "McCarthy"

A 

 Andre McCarthy (born 1987), Jamaican cricketer
 Andrew McCarthy (born 1962), American actor
 Andrew McCarthy (footballer) (born 1998), Scottish footballer
 Andrew C. McCarthy (born 1959), American attorney and columnist
 Annette McCarthy (1958-2023), American actress
 Arch McCarthy, American baseball pitcher

B 

 Benni McCarthy (born 1977), South African footballer
 Bernard McCarthy (1874–1948) New Zealand cricketer, lawyer and papal knight
 Bernie McCarthy (1943–2019), Australian rules footballer
 Brandon McCarthy (born 1983), American baseball pitcher

C 

 Callum McCarthy (born 1944), British intellectual
 Carolyn McCarthy (born 1944), U.S. congresswoman
 Carlton McCarthy, Mayor of Richmond, Virginia
 Carlton McCarthy (singer), British singer
 Charles McCarthy (disambiguation), multiple people
 Chris McCarthy (1931–2009), American racewalker
 Claire McCarthy (born 1976), Irish marathon runner
 Clem McCarthy (1882–1962), American sports announcer
 Con McCarthy (1893–1975), Australian rules footballer
 Con McCarthy (rugby league) (1894–1968), New Zealand rugby league player
 Cormac McCarthy (born 1933), Pulitzer Prize-winning American novelist

D 

 Dalton McCarthy (1836–1898), Canadian lawyer and politician
 Daniel McCarthy (disambiguation), multiple people
 David McCarthy (disambiguation), multiple people
 Dennis McCarthy (composer) (born 1945), composer of film scores
 Dominic McCarthy (1892–1975), Australian recipient of the Victoria Cross
 Don McCarthy (1955–2018), British entrepreneur
 Douglas McCarthy (born 1966), English singer
 Dudley McCarthy (1911–1987), Australian military historian and soldier

E 

 E. Jerome McCarthy marketing scholar and inventor of 4Ps of marketing
 Earl McCarthy (born 1969), Irish freestyle swimmer
 Ellis McCarthy (born 1994), American football player
 Eugene McCarthy (1916-2005), U.S. congressman and senator

F 

 Fabian "Fabe" McCarthy (born 1919), Australian rugby union player
 Francis X. McCarthy (born 1942), American actor

G 

 Garry McCarthy (born 1959), American police administrator in Newark and Chicago
 Gina McCarthy (born 1954), 13th Administrator of the Environmental Protection Agency
 Glenn McCarthy (1907–1988), American oil tycoon and businessman

H 

 Harry McCarthy, variety entertainer, wrote "The Bonnie Blue Flag" in 1861

J 

 J. P. McCarthy (1933–1995), American radio personality
 J. Thomas McCarthy (born 1937), American educator, author and attorney
 Jake McCarthy (born 1997), American baseball player
 James McCarthy (disambiguation), multiple people
 Jenny McCarthy (born 1972), American anti-vaccine activist and former Playboy model and actress
 Joanne McCarthy (disambiguation), multiple people
 Joe McCarthy (manager) (1887–1978), American baseball manager
 John McCarthy (disambiguation), multiple people
 John McCarthy (composer) (born 1961), composer of film scores
 John James McCarthy (1921-1996) Chief of Special Services Fort Sam Houston Texas, Ret Major US Army
 Joseph McCarthy (1908–1957), U.S. senator
 Joseph McCarthy (disambiguation), multiple people
 Justin McCarthy (disambiguation), multiple people

K 

 Kate McCarthy (born 1992), Australian rules footballer
 Kate McCarthy (disambiguation), multiple people
 Katie McCarthy (disambiguation), multiple people
 Kevin Owen McCarthy (born 1965), 55th Speaker of the United States House of Representatives
 Kevin McCarthy (disambiguation), multiple people

L 

 Leo T. McCarthy (1930–2007), Californian politician and businessman
 Lincoln McCarthy (born 1993), Australian rules footballer

M 

 Maeve McCarthy, Irish mathematician
 Margaret McCarthy, Irish-American migrant
 Mary McCarthy (disambiguation), multiple people
 Matt McCarthy (disambiguation), multiple people
 Melissa McCarthy (born 1970), American actress and comedian
 Michael McCarthy (disambiguation), multiple people
 Mick McCarthy (born 1959), English football player and manager
 Mick McCarthy (footballer, born 1911), Irish footballer
 Mick McCarthy (Gaelic footballer) (1965–1998), Irish Gaelic footballer
 Mike McCarthy (born 1963), American football coach

N 

 Nicholas McCarthy (disambiguation), multiple people
 Nobu McCarthy (1934–2002), Japanese-Canadian actress and model

P 

 Patrick McCarthy (disambiguation), multiple people
 Paul McCarthy (born 1945), American contemporary artist
 Pete McCarthy (1952–2004), pen name of Peter Charles Robinson, British broadcaster and travel writer
 Peter McCarthy (industrialist) (1845–1919), American industrialist and philanthropist

R 

 Rachel McCarthy (born 1984), English poet, critic and broadcaster
 Rashawn McCarthy (born 1989), Filipino-American basketball player
 Richard McCarthy (disambiguation), multiple people
 Rick McCarthy (disambiguation), multiple people
 Robert McCarthy (disambiguation), multiple people
 Rory McCarthy, (born 1975), Irish hurler

S 

 Shaun Lloyd McCarthy (1928–2000), aka Desmond Cory, British novelist and screenwriter
 Stephen McCarthy (disambiguation), multiple people
 Steve McCarthy (boxer) (born 1962), British boxer
 Steve McCarthy (ice hockey) (born 1981), Canadian ice hockey player

T 

 Thaddeus McCarthy (1455–1492), Irish bishop
 Thaddeus McCarthy (jurist) (1907–2001), New Zealand jurist
 Thomas McCarthy (disambiguation), multiple people
 Tim McCarthy (born 1949), US Secret Service agent injured in assassination attempt on President Reagan
 Tom McCarthy (director) (born 1966), American film director, screenwriter, and actor
 Tom McCarthy (novelist) (born 1969), English novelist
 Tom McCarthy (sportscaster) (born 1968), American sportscaster
 Tom McCarthy (trade unionist) (c. 1862 – 1899) British Irish trade unionist
 Tommy McCarthy (baseball) (1863–1922), American baseball player

W 

 Walter T. McCarthy (1898–1985), American lawyer and judge
 Winston McCarthy (1908–1984), New Zealand radio sports commentator

Spelled "McCarty"

A-E 

 Bobby McCarty (born 1992), American racing driver
 Calvin McCarty (born 1984), Canadian football running back
 Carolyn A. McCarty (fl. 2019), American psychologist
 Daniel T. McCarty (1912–53), American politician
 Darren McCarty (born 1972), Canadian hockey player
 David McCarty (born 1969), American baseball player
 David McCarty (American football) (born 1987), American football player
 Dax McCarty (born 1987), American soccer player
 Ernest McCarty (born 1941), American musician and playwright

H-M 

 Henry "Billy the Kid" McCarty (died 1881), American outlaw
 J. D. McCarty (1916–1980), American politician from Oklahoma
 Jim McCarty (born 1943), English pop/rock musician
 Jim McCarty (guitarist) (born 1947), American blues/rock musician
 John McCarty (fl. 1880s), American baseball player
 John McCarty (New York) (1782–1851), New York politician
 Ken McCarty (born 1958), American politician
 Kirk McCarty (born 1995), American baseball player
 Leon McCarty (1888–1962), American college sports coach
 Luther McCarty (1892–1913), American heavyweight boxer
 Maclyn McCarty (1911–2005), American geneticist
 Mary McCarty (1923–1980), American actress, singer, dancer, and comedienne
 Mary McCarty (1931–2009), All-American Girls Professional Baseball League player

R-Z 

 Richard McCarty (disambiguation), several people
 Ted McCarty (1910–2001), American electric guitar maker
 Walter McCarty (born 1974), American basketball player
 William M. McCarty (c. 1789 – 1863), American politician

Spelled "MacCarthy" 

 Denis Florence MacCarthy, Irish poet, translator, and biographer, 1818–1882
 Desmond MacCarthy, English critic, 1878–1952
 Fiona MacCarthy (1940–2020), British biographer and cultural historian

Fictional characters 

 Dwight McCarthy

See also 

 McCarthy, a disambiguation page for "McCarthy"

References 



Surnames of Irish origin
Anglicised Irish-language surnames
Patronymic surnames